St. Peter's Catholic Church, in Mendota Heights, is the oldest church in the state of Minnesota.  It was founded in 1840.

Pastors

Bishop Mathias Loras (1839)
Father Lucien Galtier (1840–1844)
Father Augustin Ravoux (1844–1857)
Father Anatole Oster (1857–1859)
Father J. Claude Robert (1859–1866)
Father Claude Genis (1866–1868)
Father Patrick F. Glennon (1868–1877)
Father Joseph Anthime Payetite (1877–1878)
Father C. Arthur Sicazrd De Carufel (1878–1881)
Father William P. Murray (1881)
Father Constantine L. Egan, O.P. (1881–1883)
Father Louis Cornelis (1883–1886)
Father Thomas F. Duane (1886–1891)
Father John Gmeiner (1891–1894)
Father Martin Mahoney (1894–1902)
Monsignor Anatole Oster (1902–1907)
Father Joseph Goiffon (1905–1908)
Father Francis A. Serpaggi (1907–1908)
Father Patrick J. O'Connor (1908–1913)
Father Martin Mahoney (1913–1931)
Father Stephen J. Cassidy (1918–1929)
Father Thomas P. Ryan (1931)
Father William J. Harrington (1931–1956)
Father Harvey F. Egan (1957–1965)
Father John V. Flaherty (1965–1969)
Father James B. Namie (1969–1970)
Father John T. Bauer (1970–1975)
Father Peter Fleming (1970–1972)
Father Raymond W. Marschall (1975–1977)
Father Michael M. Arms (1977–1989)
Father Kevin I. Clinton (1989–2005)
Father Rick Banker (2005–2008)
Father Joseph Gallatin (2008–2014)
Father Steven Hoffman (2014–present)

See also
 List of the oldest buildings in Minnesota

External links

 

19th-century Roman Catholic church buildings in the United States
Churches in Dakota County, Minnesota
Mendota, Minnesota
Religious organizations established in 1840
Peter's in Mendota, Saint
Churches in the Roman Catholic Archdiocese of Saint Paul and Minneapolis
1840 establishments in Iowa Territory